Smelly socks are socks that have acquired a strong odour due to prolonged wearing.  Their odour, which is complex and remains the object of study, is a mixture of ammonia, fatty acids (in particular, isovaleric acid), and lactic acid.

Odorous socks are a strong attractant for some animals, including dogs and mosquitos. They have proven useful in controlling the behaviour of these animals.

Although the odour of smelly socks is often associated with feet, it arises independently of contact with human feet in various foodstuffs such as dairy products, cheeses, sausages and fish sauce, and is naturally present in several plants. The smell has also been noted in building and automotive air treatment systems, where it is described as "jock socks odour" or "dirty socks syndrome".

Several technologies have been developed to incorporate materials into sock textiles which reduce or eliminate the strong smell.

Analysis
Compounds which cause socks to smell intensively include:

 butyric acid, which smells like rancid butter
 dimethyl disulphide, which smells like onions
 dimethyl trisulphide
 2-heptanone, which smells like bananas
 2-nonanone, which smells like fat, fruit or flowers
 2-octanone, which smells like apples

Air contamination
The intense smell commonly results from bacterial action upon sweat which accumulates due to confining footwear. It has also presented itself as a problem among users of prosthetics.

Smelly socks may be a source of air contamination in aircraft and dwellings.  Their distinctive odour is commonly used as a reference.

A 1996 Popular Mechanics article describes "jock socks odour" complaints as one of the magazine's most frequent queries with regard to automotive air conditioning systems, attributing it to fungal growth within the auto. The term "Dirty Sock Syndrome" is used to describe unpleasant odours that arise in building heating and cooling systems. High-efficiency heat pumps in the southeastern US have been noted as frequent offenders.

Medical aspects

The odour is a diagnostic feature of a serious medical condition, Isovaleric acidemia.

A widespread consumer perception of the odour in the medication metformin, frequently used to treat Type 2 diabetes, may have contributed to patient refusals of the treatment.

A test of olfactory abilities deemed useful in Japan employs detection of "sweaty socks", along with two other odours, as a useful metric of these abilities.

When fresh, alkyl nitrites or "poppers", smell fruity, but when stale their aroma seems like smelly socks.

Solutions

There are various products designed to handle the problem of smelly socks, by containing the smell or eliminating it.

In a police station in Brighton, England, the police installed a stinkproof locker specifically to keep prisoners' smelly socks in while they are in custody.

Several technologies have been developed to address the problem by modifying the composition of sock materials. In February 1997, The Daily Mirror reported that a new fabric had been invented by British scientists to eliminate smelly socks. Disinfectant treatments such as silver nanoparticles may be applied to socks to prevent them from smelling. The United States Air Force Academy issued a 2009 request to vendors that included socks incorporating antimicrobial silver yarn technology. This technology has encountered some opposition; a study conducted by researchers at Arizona State University examined the possibility that the silver particles could be released when the socks were washed, posing environmental concerns. In 2000, the University of California announced a joint venture with private companies to develop socks that would reduce the problem by incorporating  compounds, a relatively stable form of chlorine. In 2005 Dow Corning proposed the incorporation of alkoxysilanes as a preventive measure.

Researchers reported, in 2011, on a technique to permanently block the development of pathogenic germs, which can cause odour in socks and other clothing.  A team led by Jason Lockli of the University of Georgia reported in the American Chemical Society's Applied Materials and Interfaces that the anti-microbial treatment of "smelly socks" could "offer low cost protection for healthcare facilities, such as hospitals."

Animal attraction
In a study of the odours most likely to attract mosquitos, smelly socks were found to be the most effective, topping the list along with Limburger cheese.  Their strong odour will also attract other dangerous wild animals such as bear.

Because this smell is so effective at attracting mosquitos, its use has been explored for mosquito control in places where malaria is prevalent.  An imitation foot odour has been synthesised at the University of Wageningen. The synthetic odour is then used to bait traps which attract the mosquitos and so divert them from biting people. The synthetic mixture of ammonia, fatty acids, and lactic acid is effective but not as good as real sweaty socks.  The composition of the authentic smell is still being analysed to determine the remaining active ingredients. A project in Kenya funded by Grand Challenges Canada and the Bill & Melinda Gates Foundation involves harvesting smelly sock odour with cotton pads that are then used to bait traps.

The East African jumping spider or vampire spider preys upon mosquitos which have fed upon blood.  It is attracted to the same smell for this reason and this has been demonstrated using an olfactometer which was loaded alternately with clean and smelly socks.

Dogs are strongly attracted to the scent of socks that have been worn by humans. They may self-medicate themselves during attacks of separation anxiety by focusing on these items. The attraction is used in dog training, where the odorous socks may serve as a distractant or as a lure during crate training.

Animal repelling
Smelly socks have been used to repel deer.  Benefits include they are cheap and accessible, require little effort to put out each morning, and are quite effective at keeping deer out of your flower garden.

Artistic use
The smell of dirty socks was the most unpleasant of the smells provided in the movie Polyester which featured Odorama in the form of scratch and sniff cards.

At Fort Siloso in Singapore, the liquid scent of smelly socks is part of the exhibition which provides tourists with a sensory impression of its historical use during WW2.

Botany

The plant White Plume Grevillea has long white flowers whose stink resembles that of smelly socks, causing the plant to be known as "Smelly Socks Grevillea" or "Old Socks".  Another plant with a similar smell and name is Clary Sage.  The herb valerian has a musty smell of this sort too. Mushrooms of the genus Amanita often have a strong odour which may also seem like that of smelly socks.

Fetishism
Some people experience erotic arousal from smelling well worn socks as a fetish. It is one of the most widespread forms of olfactophilia.  In a 1994 study, 45% of those with a foot fetish were found to be aroused by smelly socks.
Those aroused by smelling socks may be aroused only by a certain type of sock, those worn by a particular person or type of person, or in specific scenarios, such as being dominated or instructed to smell socks.

Folk medicine
Smelly socks are favoured for use as a component in the making of powerful charms or spells, especially in voodoo or magic of African origin.  They may be worn around the neck as a cure for a cold.
In addition, used socks may be used in spells cast on particular people, namely love spells, (the socks of the two parties may be bound together during the spell) binding spells, (the socks of the offender are knotted to inflict a binding on that person) or curses (the socks are burned or otherwise destroyed to inflict harm on their wearer).

Marketing
Smelly socks were used as the basis for a marketing campaign for British Knights sneakers.  Viewers were invited to send in their socks which would then be assessed for smell by a panel of judges which included a dog.

Popular culture
A recurring theme in the television series Married... with Children revolved around the stinky socks of the character Al Bundy. Professional wrestler Mick Foley used a stinky sock in several of his matches, called Mr. Socko.

See also
 Socks
 Foot odour
 Body odour
 Body odour and sexual attraction
 Foot fetishism
 Stinky feet

References

Odor
Socks
Laundry